United Nations Security Council resolution 460, adopted on 21 December 1979, after taking note of the Lancaster House Agreement, the council decided to terminate measures taken against Southern Rhodesia in resolutions 232 (1966) and 253 (1968) and any subsequent resolutions. The resolution deplored the "loss of life, waste and suffering" over the past 14 years caused by the rebellion in southern Rhodesia.

The resolution went on to dissolve the committee established in Resolution 253, and commended member states, particularly the front-line states, for their implementation of the sanctions against southern Rhodesia. The council demanded urgent assistance from the international community to the Zimbabwean people, and reminded the parties to uphold the agreement.

Resolution 460 ended by calling upon the administering power, the United Kingdom, to ensure that no South African forces or other foreign mercenaries remain or enter the country. Finally, the council decided to keep the situation under review until Southern Rhodesia gained full independence (as Zimbabwe).

The resolution was adopted by 13 votes to none, while Czechoslovakia and the Soviet Union abstained.

See also
 List of United Nations Security Council Resolutions 401 to 500 (1976–1982)
 History of Zimbabwe
 Rhodesian Bush War
 Unilateral Declaration of Independence (Rhodesia)

References
Text of the Resolution at undocs.org

External links
 

Aftermath of the Rhodesian Bush War
 0460
1979 in Africa
 0460
December 1979 events
1979 in Rhodesia